or Hector was a Japanese video game developer and publisher. It had a Virtual Boy game in development, entitled Virtual Battle Ball; however, it was eventually canceled.

List of games

Shogun
Emoyan no 10-bai Pro Yakyuu
Great Deal
Pocket no Naka no Oukoku (canceled)
 In , a side scrolling action game released by Hect for the Family Computer in 1992, the player controls a green-haired boy named Ricky Slater on a quest to rescue his kidnapped family from the evil necromancer, Count Crimson. It features gameplay similar to that of Zelda II and Prince of Persia, as well as cutscenes like those found in Ninja Gaiden, all in a Steampunk setting. Levels include a pirate ship and a clock tower. The game uses Kanji in dialogue, which was rare for games of that era, which typically use katakana.

The game sold few copies in its limited release, due its timing late in the Famicom's lifespan. Upon release, the Japanese gaming publication Weekly Famitsu gave it a score of 24 out of 40 and praised the smoothness of the character animations. 1up.com and Retro Gamer retrospectively considered the game's graphics and animation of a higher quality than the many Zelda II clones for the Famicom. A North American version was planned and previewed publicly, but was ultimately cancelled, possibly due to the NES' waning popularity in the region and the rising popularity of the Super NES console. The game has never been released outside of Japan, nor has it been re-released in emulation for other systems. Its rarity has made it a collector's item in Japan's used games market.
3-Fun Yosou Umaban Club
Golf Grand Slam
America Daitōryō Senkyo
Ihatovo Monogatari
Stealth
Simulation Pro Yakyuu
Furuta Atsuya no Simulation Pro Yakyuu 2
Firestriker
Thoroughbred Breeder
Square Deal: The Game of Two Dimensional Poker
City Connection
Formation Z (Famicom)
Yamamura Misa Suspense: Kyouto Zaiteku Satsujin Jiken (Famicom)

See also
List of Famicom games

References

External links 

 Hect at GameFAQs

Amusement companies of Japan
Video game companies established in 1988
Video game companies disestablished in 2002
Video game companies of Japan
Video game development companies
Video game publishers